Kahraman is the Turkish word for hero, borrowed from Persian qahramân (قهرمان). It is also a transliteration for Arabic كهرمان meaning amber, borrowed from Persian kahrobâ (کهربا). The first etymology is the source for the modern Turkish surname. Notable people with the surname include:

People

Given name
Kahraman Demirtaş (born 1994), Turkish professional footballer
Kahraman Sadıkoğlu, Turkish businessman

Surname
Emre Kahraman (born 1987), Turkish football player
Erol Kahraman (born 1983), Turkish Cypriot ice hockey player and footballer
Hayv Kahraman (born 1981), Iraqi artist and painter
İlyas Kahraman (born 1976), Turkish professional soccer player
İsmail Kahraman (born 1940), Turkish politician from the Justice and Development Party
Volkan Kahraman (born 1979), Austrian football player of Turkish descent

Places
Kahraman, Çine, a village in the District of Çine, Aydın Province, Turkey
Kahramanmaraş, a city in the Mediterranean Region, Turkey and the administrative center of Kahramanmaraş Province

Others
Kahraman (album), studio album by Turkish/Belgian singer Hadise

See also
Karaman (disambiguation)
Ghahreman
Ghahremani

Given names
Turkish-language surnames
Turkish masculine given names